The following lists events that happened during 2014 in the Tunisian Republic.

Events

January 

 26 January - The Tunisian Constitution of 2014 was adopted on 26 January 2014 by the Constituent Assembly.
 29 January - The Laarayedh Cabinet led by Prime Minister Ali Laarayedh was dissolved and the Jomaa Cabinet led by Prime Minister Mehdi Jomaa was formed.

July 

 16 July - 2014 Chaambi Mountains attack: Two checkpoints in the Chaambi Mountains are attacked by militants.

October 

 26 October - The 2014 Tunisian parliamentary election was held.

November 

 23 November - The 2014 Tunisian presidential election was held.

Sports 

 Tunisia competed at the 2014 Summer Youth Olympics held in Nanjing, China from 16 August to 28 August 2014.

References 

 
Years of the 21st century in Tunisia
Tunisia
Tunisia
2010s in Tunisia